Rimbo is a locality situated in Norrtälje Municipality, Stockholm County, Sweden with 4,629 inhabitants in 2010. Rimbo is located about 20 km west of the municipal seat of Norrtälje.

Rimbo grew up as a railhead at the junction between the narrow gauge railways to Uppsala and Norrtälje (1884), Stockholm (1885) and Hallstavik (1896). The last line (to Stockholm, part of Roslagsbanan) was closed in 1981. A formal decision has been taken to reopen the 14 km line to Kårsta (the present northern terminus of Roslagsbanan), but no funds have been allocated.

Rimbo has a successful men's handball team, which played in the first tier of the Swedish handball system (Elitserien (men's handball)) in the 2013–2014 season.

References

External links 
Official websites
 Norrtälje municipality
Other websites
 Rimbo portal
 Rimbo IF (sports)

Populated places in Norrtälje Municipality